Milocera zika is a moth species in the genus Milocera named after the Zika Forest in Uganda, Africa.

References

External links 

 Milocera zika at www.afromoths.net (retrieved 25-03-2016)

Macariini
Lepidoptera of Uganda
Moths described in 2001
Moth genera